A tabard is a type of short coat that was commonly worn by men during the late Middle Ages and early modern period in Europe. Generally worn outdoors, the coat was either sleeveless or had short sleeves or shoulder pieces. In its more developed form it was open at the sides, and it could be worn with or without a belt. Though most were ordinary garments, often work clothes, tabards might be emblazoned on the front and back with a coat of arms (livery), and in this form they survive as the distinctive garment of officers of arms.

In modern British usage, the term has been revived for what is known in American English as a cobbler apron: a lightweight open-sided upper overgarment, of similar design to its medieval and heraldic counterpart, worn in particular by workers in the catering, cleaning and healthcare industries as protective clothing, or outdoors by those requiring high-visibility clothing. Tabards may also be worn by percussionists in marching bands in order to protect their uniforms from the straps and rigging used to support the instruments.

Middle Ages

A tabard (from the French tabarde) was originally a humble outer garment of tunic form, generally without sleeves, worn by peasants, monks and foot-soldiers. In this sense, the earliest citation recorded in the Oxford English Dictionary dates from c.1300.

By the second half of the 15th century, tabards, now open at the sides and so usually belted, were also being worn by knights in military contexts over their armour, and were usually emblazoned with their arms (though sometimes worn plain). The Oxford English Dictionary first records this use of the word in English in 1450. Tabards were apparently distinguished from surcoats by being open-sided, and by being shorter.  In its later form, a tabard normally comprised four textile panels – two large panels hanging down the wearer's front and back, and two smaller panels hanging over his arms as shoulder-pieces or open "sleeves" – each emblazoned with the same coat of arms. Tabards became an important means of battlefield identification with the development of plate armour as the use of shields declined. They are frequently represented on tomb effigies and monumental brasses of the late 15th and early 16th centuries.

A very expensive, but plain, garment described as a tabard is worn by Giovanni Arnolfini in the Arnolfini Portrait of 1434 (National Gallery, London). This may be made of silk and/or velvet, and is trimmed and fully lined with fur, possibly sable.

At The Queen's College, Oxford, the scholars on the foundation were called tabarders, from the tabard (not in this case an emblazoned garment) which they wore.

A surviving garment similar to the medieval tabard is the monastic scapular. This is a wide strip of fabric worn front back of the body, with an opening for the head and no sleeves. It may have a hood, and may be worn under or over a belt.

British heraldry

By the end of the 16th century, the tabard was particularly associated with officers of arms. The shift in emphasis was reported by John Stow in 1598, when he described a tabard as:

In the case of Royal officers of arms, the tabard is emblazoned with the coat of arms of the sovereign. Private officers of arms, such as still exist in Scotland, make use of tabards emblazoned with the coat of arms of the person who employs them. In the United Kingdom the different ranks of officers of arms can be distinguished by the fabric from which their tabards are made. The tabard of a king of arms is made of velvet, the tabard of a herald of arms of satin, and that of a pursuivant of arms of damask silk. The oldest surviving English herald's tabard is that of Sir William Dugdale as Garter King of Arms (1677–1686).

It was at one time the custom for English pursuivants to wear their tabards "athwart", that is to say with the smaller ("shoulder") panels at the front and back, and the larger panels over the arms; but this practice was ended during the reign of James II and VII.

The derisive Scots nickname of "" for John Balliol (c. 1249 – 1314) may originate from either an alleged incident where his arms were stripped from his tabard in public, or a reference to the Balliol arms which are a plain shield with an orle, also known as an inescutcheon voided.

Canadian heraldry
In the Diamond Jubilee year of the Queen of Canada, the Governor General unveiled a new tabard for the use of the Chief Herald of Canada. This new royal blue tabard, for exclusively Canadian use and of uniquely Canadian design, is a modern take on the traditional look. The tabard differs from others of more traditional design in that the Canadian royal arms appear on the sleeves, while the front and back of the tabard are covered with Native Canadian-inspired emblematic representations of the raven-polar bears of the Canadian Heraldic Authority's coat of arms.

Gallery

Cultural allusions
A tabard was the inn sign of the Tabard Inn in Southwark, London, established in 1307 and remembered as the starting point for Geoffrey Chaucer's pilgrims on their journey to Canterbury in The Canterbury Tales, dating from about the 1380s.

In E. C. Bentley's short story "The Genuine Tabard", published in his collection Trent Intervenes in 1938, a wealthy American couple purchase an antique heraldic tabard, having been told that it was worn in 1783 by Sir Rowland Verey, Garter King of Arms, when proclaiming the Peace of Versailles from the steps of St James's Palace. The amateur detective Philip Trent is able to point out that it in fact bears the post-1837 royal arms.

Tabards, while not mentioned by name, feature prominently in the Touhou Project video game series, being worn by at least seven characters, ranging from minor enemies to end game bosses. The design of the characters that wear them revolves around the tabard, usually with little additional detail.

See also

 Apron
 Heraldry
 Surcoat
 Vest
 Scapular

References

Military uniforms
Heraldry
History of clothing (Western fashion)
Medieval European costume